"The Music's Got Me!" is a 1992 song by German DJ and record production team Bass Bumpers, released as the third single from their debut album, Advance (1992). It was a Top 20 hit in both France and Spain, while peaking at number 25 in the UK. On the UK Dance Singles Chart, it hit number four. In the US, it reached number 36 on the Billboard Hot Dance Club Play chart. In 2015, the team released the song with new mixes from North2South, La Chord, and Taito Tikaro.

Track listing
 7", Netherlands (1992)
"The Music's Got Me" (Radio Version) — 4:04
"The Music's Got Me" (Charismatic Mix) — 4:04

 12", Europe (1992)
"The Music's Got Me" (Charismatic Mix) — 6:25
"The Music's Got Me" (Dread Mix) — 6:10
"Touch Me" (Factory Dub) — 6:28

 CD maxi, France (1992)
"The Music's Got Me" (Radio Version N°1) — 4:05
"The Music's Got Me" (Radio Version N°2) — 4:14
"The Music's Got Me" (Charismatic Mix) — 6:30
"The Music's Got Me" (Dread Mix) — 4:16

Charts

References

 

1992 singles
1992 songs
House music songs
Bass Bumpers songs